The Brazos Valley Council of Governments (BVCOG) is a voluntary association of cities, counties and special districts in the Brazos Valley region of Central Texas.

Based in Bryan, the Brazos Valley Council of Governments is a member of the Texas Association of Regional Councils.

Counties served
Brazos
Burleson
Grimes
Leon
Madison
Robertson
Washington

Largest cities in the region
Bryan
College Station
Brenham
Navasota
Hearne
Madisonville
Caldwell

References

External links
Brazos Valley Council of Governments - Official site.

Texas Association of Regional Councils